Anthony Ralph Granville (born 23 April 1931) is a Scottish former footballer.

He won the 1955 Scottish Cup with Clyde, before having spells with Nottingham Forest and Gateshead.

References

External links

Scottish footballers
Clyde F.C. players
Nottingham Forest F.C. players
Gateshead F.C. players
Living people
1931 births
Scottish Football League players
English Football League players
Association football wing halves
Footballers from Glasgow